Eggnog or egg nog is a beverage traditionally made with milk and/or cream, sugar, whipped eggs and sometimes distilled spirits.

Eggnog may also refer to:

Eggnog, Utah,  an unincorporated community in Garfield County
Eggnog (album), a 1991 EP by the Melvins
Eggnog Riot or Grog Mutiny, a riot at the United States Military Academy in West Point, New York, in 1826
EggNOG (database), a database of biological information hosted by the EMBL
Egg Nog (trimaran), the first trimaran sailboat designed by Victor Tchetchet in the 1950s with the name Egg Nog
Egg Nog II (trimaran), the second trimaran sailboat designed by Victor Tchetchet in the 1950s with the name Egg Nog